The 2022 Arab Beach Soccer Championship is the fifth edition of the Arab Beach Soccer Championship  ,  the premier beach soccer championship in Arab contested by men's national teams who are members of the Union of Arab Football Associations (UAFA).  

,
UAE is  the defending champions,  they  defeating Morocco 3-2 in the final to secure their 1st title.

Teams

Seedings

Venues

Group stage

References

Arab Beach Soccer Championship
Arab Beach Soccer Championship
International association football competitions hosted by Saudi Arabia